Citadel of Dreams is an original novella written by Dave Stone and based on the long-running British science fiction television series Doctor Who. It features the Seventh Doctor and Ace. It was released both as a standard edition hardback and a deluxe edition featuring a frontispiece by Lee Sullivan. Both editions have a foreword by Andrew Cartmel.

Plot
Ace tries to help a tormented homeless child in a city where time itself is falling apart. Far away, if that means anything anymore, the Doctor is undergoing dangerous ethical dilemmas.

Featured Alien Races

Dracori, the original inhabitants of the planet, with several hundred eyes and tentacles.
Sloater, when transformed, has a thousand temporary mouths and orifices on the surface of his flesh.
The City itself is a living creature.

2002 British novels
2002 science fiction novels
Doctor Who novellas
Novels by Dave Stone
British science fiction novels
British novellas
Telos Publishing books